Walter L. Sharpe III (born July 18, 1986) is an American professional basketball player who plays for Yulon Luxgen Dinos of the Super Basketball League (SBL).

Early career
Sharpe attended Parker High School in Birmingham, Alabama.

Considered a four-star recruit by Rivals.com, Sharpe was listed as the No. 9 power forward and the No. 44 player in the nation in 2004.

He later signed with Mississippi State University. Sharpe's career at Mississippi State was suspended frequently during his freshman season, declared academically ineligible during his sophomore season and eventually left the team.

He transferred to the University of Alabama at Birmingham, where he averaged 14.2 points per game in 12 games before being declared academically ineligible for the spring semester of the 2007–08 season.

Professional career
He was selected as the 32nd overall pick by the Seattle SuperSonics in the 2008 NBA Draft. Shortly after being drafted, the Sonics traded his rights to the Detroit Pistons. Shortly after being drafted, Sharpe was diagnosed with narcolepsy, a sleeping disorder that causes excessive sleepiness.

On July 13, 2009, he was traded along with Arron Afflalo to the Denver Nuggets for a second round pick in the 2011 NBA Draft.

On July 31, 2009, he was traded along with Sonny Weems and cash considerations to the Milwaukee Bucks for Malik Allen. On October 26, 2009, he was waived by the Bucks.

On December 9, 2011, Sharpe signed with the Memphis Grizzlies for the lockout-shortened 2011–12 season's training camp.  On December 23, two days before the start of the regular season, Sharpe was waived by the Grizzlies

In March 2013, he signed with GlobalPort Batang Pier of the PBA, replacing Justin Williams as their import. On March 19, 2013, GlobalPort Batang Pier terminated his contract due to "conduct unbecoming of a professional basketball player" after a controversial photo of him sleeping on parking lot pavement went viral. GlobarPort Batang Pier team manager BJ Manalo said that they "will not tolerate actions of any local or foreign player who destroys the integrity" of both their team and that of the PBA. Sharpe played only two games in the PBA.

On July 1, 2014, he signed with Brujos de Guayama of Puerto Rico. He left Guayama after appearing in only one game.

On February 9, 2015, he signed with Cocodrilos de Caracas of Venezuela for the 2015 LPB season.

NBA career statistics

Regular season 

|-
| align="left" | 
| align="left" | Detroit
| 8 || 0 || 2.5 || .364 || .000 || .000 || .4 || .0 || .0 || .2 || 1.0
|-
| align="left" | Career
| align="left" | 
| 8 || 0 || 2.5 || .364 || .000 || .000 || .4 || .0 || .0 || .2 || 1.0

References

External links
NBA Profile
Profile at Eurobasket.com

1986 births
Living people
African-American basketball players
American expatriate basketball people in China
American expatriate basketball people in the Dominican Republic
American expatriate basketball people in Mexico
American expatriate basketball people in the Philippines
American expatriate basketball people in Taiwan
American expatriate basketball people in Venezuela
American men's basketball players
Basketball players from Birmingham, Alabama
Cocodrilos de Caracas players
Dakota Wizards players
Detroit Pistons players
Fort Wayne Mad Ants players
Idaho Stampede players
Mississippi State Bulldogs men's basketball players
New Mexico Thunderbirds players
NorthPort Batang Pier players
People with narcolepsy
Philippine Basketball Association imports
Power forwards (basketball)
Seattle SuperSonics draft picks
Small forwards
Soles de Mexicali players
UAB Blazers men's basketball players
21st-century African-American sportspeople
20th-century African-American people
Taiwan Beer basketball players
Yulon Luxgen Dinos players
Kinmen Kaoliang Liquor basketball players
Super Basketball League imports